Elsie A. B. Effah Kaufmann   (born 7 September 1969) is a Ghanaian academic, academic administrator, biomedical engineer and current host of the National Science and Maths Quiz. In December 2020, Elsie Kaufmann was appointed an associate professor at the University of Ghana, and was appointed the Dean of the School of Engineering Sciences on 1 August 2022.

Education 
The daughter of educators, she hails from Assin in the Central Region. Kaufmann began her secondary education at the Aburi Girls' Senior High School, and obtained her International Baccalaureate Diploma from United World College of the Atlantic in Wales in 1988.

She proceeded to the University of Pennsylvania for her Bachelor of Science in Engineering (BSE), a Master of Science in Engineering (MSE) and PhD in Bioengineering.

Career 
Kaufmann was a research supervisor at the Department of Chemistry at Rutgers University in New Jersey, United States of America, from May 1998 to June 2001; after being a Teaching Assistant at the Department of Bioengineering at the University of Pennsylvania, United States of America. She was also a Senior Lecturer and the first Head of the Department of Biomedical Engineering, University of Ghana (2006–2012, 2014–2016).  Elsie Effah Kaufmann is a visiting scholar and Founding Head of the Department of Orthotics and Prosthetics at the University of Health and Allied Sciences in Ho, Ghana. She is a University Council Member at Ghana Communication Technology University.

She is the first woman to be appointed dean of the School of Engineering Sciences, University of Ghana, taking up the post from 1 August 2022.

Awards and recognition 
Kaufmann was a Fellow of the International Women's Forum Leadership Foundation. She was awarded in 2009, as the University of Ghana's Best Teacher Award for the Sciences.

She received the International Women's Forum Leadership Foundation Fellowship in 2011 and the 2017 Impact Africa Summit Laureate for Education in Ghana.

She is also the first female recipient of the 2018 Golden Torch Award for International Academic Leadership by the National Society of Black Engineers (NSBE) at the 44th Annual Conference held in the United States of America.

She is also the recipient of the National Society of Black Engineers' 2018 Golden T.O.R.C.H. (Technical OutReach and Community Help) Award for International Academic Leadership in recognition of her excellence in support of academics on an international level and exhibition of commitment to the Science, Technology, Engineering and Mathematic (STEM) fields.

She was awarded the Woman of the Year at the 2022 Exclusive Men of the Year Africa Awards. 

Kaufmann was elected a Fellow of the Ghana Academy of Arts and Sciences in June 2022. She is also a Fellow of Biomaterials Science and Engineering, elected in December 2020 and a Professional Engineer of the Ghana Institution of Engineering. She holds a PMP Certification from the Institute of Project Management Professionals - Ghana. Elsie Kaufmann has also participated in Executive Education programs at Harvard Business School and INSEAD.

See also 
 Aburi Girls' Senior High School

References

Living people
Ghanaian bioengineers
University of Pennsylvania School of Engineering and Applied Science alumni
People educated at Atlantic College
Alumni of Aburi Girls' Senior High School
Biomedical engineers
Ghanaian women engineers
Academic staff of the University of Ghana
Akan people
Fante people
1969 births
Ghanaian scientists
Ghanaian academics